Byron Burgering (born 28 November 2000) is a Dutch footballer who plays as a forward for Dutch Derde Divisie club GVVV. He made his debut for FC Eindhoven in August 2019. In February 2021 he signed for Miedź Legnica.

Career statistics

Club

Notes

References

2000 births
Living people
Dutch footballers
Association football forwards
FC Eindhoven players
Eerste Divisie players
Sportlust '46 players
III liga players
Dutch expatriate footballers
Expatriate footballers in Poland
Dutch expatriate sportspeople in Poland